National Parks of Haiti are places of natural or historical value designated for protection and sustainable utilization.

La Visite National Park and Pic Macaya National Park were the first two national parks to be established in Haiti, both in 1983. They were created largely through the efforts of Charles A. Woods and colleagues. Grande Colline National Park was established on July 23, 2014, and Grand Bois National Park and Deux Mamelles National Park were established on September 23, 2015. Those three recent parks were created largely through the efforts of S. Blair Hedges and Philippe Bayard.

Haiti currently has 15 national parks, not including other protected areas:
La Visite National Park
Pic Macaya National Park
Grande Colline National Park
Grand Bois National Park
Deux Mamelles National Park
National History Park – Citadelle, Sans-Souci Palace
Martissant Urban National Park
Pélerin National Park
Canapé-Vert National Park
Lagon des Huîtres National Park
Sant d'Eau National Park
 Forêt des Pins 1 National Park
 Forêt des Pins 2 National Park
Three Bays National Park
Île-à-Vache National Park 
Les Matheux National History Park 
Zone Reservée Péligre National Park

References

External links
Haiti National Trust
UNESCO, National History

 List
Haiti
National parks
Parks in Haiti
National parks